Lunte District is a district of Northern Province, Zambia. It was separated from Mporokoso District in 2017.

References 

Districts of Northern Province, Zambia